John Price (Pricaeus) (c. 1602–1676) was an English classical scholar, publisher and collector of books. He was a Roman Catholic who described himself as ‘Anglo-Britannus’.

In 1635, in Paris, he published the Apologia of Apuleius.

From 1652 the Medicis employed him as their "keeper of coins".  He was also appointed professor of Greek at Pisa.

In 1661 he moved, under patronage of Cardinal Francesco Barberini, to Rome where he died in 1676.

References

1600s births
1676 deaths
17th-century English historians
English male non-fiction writers